Leandro Simi, (born 29 October 1977), is a Brazilian futsal player who plays for Corinthians and the Brazilian national futsal team.

References

External links
FIFA profile
Liga Futsal profile
Futsalplanet profile

1977 births
Living people
Brazilian men's futsal players
FS Cartagena players
Pan American Games gold medalists for Brazil
Futsal players at the 2007 Pan American Games
Medalists at the 2007 Pan American Games
Pan American Games medalists in futsal